Westfield Airport  is a public use airport located two nautical miles (4 km) west of the central business district of Westfield, a city in Hamilton County, Indiana, United States. It is privately owned by Leslie Wheeler.

The Indy Flyers Light Aircraft Association holds meetings at this airport on the second Wednesday of each month.

Facilities and aircraft 
It has one runway designated 18/36 with a turf surface measuring 3,000 by 100 feet (914 x 30 m). For the 12-month period ending December 31, 2006, the airport had 8,075 general aviation aircraft operations, an average of 22 per day. At that time there were 17 aircraft based at this airport: 59% ultralight and 41% single-engine.

References

External links 
 

Airports in Indiana
Transportation buildings and structures in Hamilton County, Indiana